Beginner's Luck is a 1935 Our Gang short comedy film directed by Gus Meins.  It was the 135th Our Gang short (47th talking episode) that was released. It was also the first short for seven-year-old  Carl "Alfalfa" Switzer and his ten-year-old brother  Harold Switzer to appear.

Plot

Spanky has been entered into an amateur show by his overly aggressive stage mother. He wants nothing to do with this and would rather not act. The gang comes up with a plan to disrupt his recitation and make him flop which makes Spanky very pleased.

At the theater, the mother infuriates the MC saying 'My son is too much of an artist to open a show". After the first act, as the mother is putting on his costume the MC asks if he's ready which he isn't and the MC decides to have him go on last.

Spanky befriends a girl called Daisy who has bombed her act but needs the prize money to buy a special dress. Spanky has a change of heart and decides to win the prize. He asks permission from his mom. She says "All I want is that you are a hit". He promises Daisy, "Girlie, the dress is in the bag". Now he has to tell the gang. His mom won't let him go into the audience as he's about to go on. Instead, she volunteers to speak to the boys. She has no idea there is a plot and just gives them a pep talk about rooting for Spanky.

Spanky steps out on the stage clad in a Roman Centurion costume, reciting William Shakespeare's Julius Caesar. The gang erupts with noisemakers and peashooters. Spanky stoically performing his act with him having an amusing slow burn annoyance while enduring his friends embarrassing him surprisingly makes his act the hit of the show, with everyone laughing and loving it except his Mother.

Spanky tries to shut his visor on his helmet but it gets stuck shut he starts to roam around the stage like a Chinese dragon. The mother begs that he be taken off, but he is too much of a hit. She tries to run on the stage but the MC grabs her. The mother then goes behind the curtain with a stage pole to pull her son off. She felt she had to rescue him from this cruel, mean audience. She tries to put and end to the audience's enjoyment of laughing at her son. She moves the pole out trying to catch Spanky, only to insert the pole into an electrical outlet. This shocks her, she drops the pole and is knocked back to be sitting on her heels. She has accidentally opened the curtain grommet which holds the curtain halves together. She is kneeling there wringing the shock out of her hands.

She hooks Spanky and starts to pull him back, he is fighting her and she is being pulled out on the stage a little. It takes a little time but she has him close and it's only a few more minutes and she will have him. The grandmother sees the grommet hook dangling between the mother's legs in between her dress hem and shoes. The Old lady sees her chance to give a comeuppance to Spanky's mom. She turns to the MC saying "Here's where we stop the show". The MC says "GO AHEAD" knowing the audience is going to love this. The curtain raises and the hook fits right into the mother's hem, where it's impossible to remove. It worked so well the mother doesn't even know her dress has been snagged. Then the mother feels it and realizes her predicament. Spanky's mom lets out a screech. The mother is now the one who is being humiliated on stage as the curtain goes higher her dress goes up with the audience howling its approval. The dress is yanked off her and runs up on the curtain. The mother is thrown down to kneeling on the stage in her slip, she goes into shock and becomes petrified her head is back, mouth wide open and eyes looking straight up, she seems hypnotized by her dress dangling on the curtain. Spanky rushes to hide her from being ogled and places a stage prop in front of her, once this is in place he hears a wild increase in the laughter, the prop has a caricature of a squatting dog's body on it with the mother's head perched on top. Spanky looks at his mom, she looks so humiliated his eyes bulge and his helmet top starts to spin wildly. The audience is near a riotous level of howling at her. Spanky's mother's rescue has been a fiasco with her being made a spectacle of on the stage.

Cast

The Gang
 George McFarland as Spanky
 Matthew Beard as Stymie
 Scotty Beckett as Scotty
 Billie Thomas as Buckwheat
 Alvin Buckelew as Alvin
 Jerry Tucker as Jerry
 Eileen Bernstein as Our Gang member
 Sidney Kibrick as Our Gang member
 Cecilia Murray as Our Gang member
 Donald Profitt as Our Gang member
 Merrill Strong as Our Gang member
 Pete the Pup as himself

Additional cast
 Marianne Edwards as Daisy Dimple
 Laura June Kenny as Floradora Dolly
 The Cabin Kids as Themselves
 Bonnie Lynn as Little girl singing
 The Meglin Kiddies as the Floradora Dollies
 Carl Switzer as Arizona Nightingale
 Harold Switzer as Arizona Nightingale
 Freddie Walburn as Kid with the harmonica
 Jackie White as Tapdancer
 Bess Flowers as Friend of Spanky's mother
 Charlie Hall as Stage hand
 Tom Herbert as Master of Ceremonies
 Ruth Hiatt as Daisy's mother
 Kitty Kelly as Spanky's mother
 James C. Morton as Piano player
 May Wallace as Spanky's grandmother
 Ernie Alexander as Audience member
 Fred Holmes as Audience member
 Jack Lipson as Audience member
 Tommy McFarland as Audience member
 Robert McKenzie as Audience member
 Snooky Valentine as Undetermined role

See also
 Our Gang filmography

References

External links

1935 films
1935 short films
American black-and-white films
Films directed by Gus Meins
Hal Roach Studios short films
1935 comedy films
Our Gang films
1930s American films